Bonola is an underground station on Line 1 of the Milan Metro in Milan, Italy. The station was opened on 12 April 1980 as part of the extension from Lotto to San Leonardo.

References

External links

Line 1 (Milan Metro) stations
Railway stations opened in 1980
1980 establishments in Italy
Railway stations in Italy opened in the 20th century